Andrena hadfieldi is a species of bee in the family Andrena that resides in the Southwestern United States, named in honor of retired Canadian Astronaut Chris Hadfield. Its discovery is based on a single holotype, initially collected in 1989 but re-examined in 2020.

References

hadfieldi